Peleng 3.5/8A is an 8 mm super-wideangle circular fisheye photographic lens, and is designed as an interchangeable lens for Canon, Nikon, Pentax, Olympus digital or film cameras which have or don't have the instant-return diaphragm automatic control device. The lens has a variable diaphragm from f/3.5 to f/16. The lens has antireflective coating. This lens casts a 24mm image circle on a 24x36mm frame. It occupies only part of frame 24x36 and fits in a small side of a frame with a small cutting along the edges. The geometric centers of the image and the frame coincide.

Gallery

External links 
 Belarusian Optical and Mechanical Association (BELOMO)
 Peleng 8mm f/3.5 Fisheye (converted to EOS mount) - Test Report / Review
 Peleng 8mm f/3.5 Reviews and feedbacks

Soviet photographic lenses